Sophronisca annulicornis is a species of beetle in the family Cerambycidae. It was described by Stephan von Breuning in 1942.

References

Desmiphorini
Beetles described in 1942